Eppelborn (Saarländisch: Ebbelborn or Ebbelborre) is a municipality in the district of Neunkirchen, in Saarland, Germany. The municipality encompasses 7 villages: Eppelborn, Wiesbach, Dirmingen, Humes, Habach, Hierscheid, Bubach-Calmeswieler und Macherbach.

It is situated approximately 20 km north of Saarbrücken.

References

Neunkirchen (German district)